The Town of Hartman is a Statutory Town in Prowers County, Colorado, United States. The town population was 56 at the 2020 United States Census. The town is located North of SH-196. The town has one historic site, the old Hartman Gymnasium. The circa 1938 gymnasium is associated with New Deal programs in Prowers County. The building is the only example of Works Progress Administration construction in Hartman and one of only a few such projects in the county. Its use as a community center continues to contribute to the social history of Hartman.

History
A post office called Hartman has been in operation since 1908. The community was named after W. P. Hartman, a railroad official.

Geography 

Demographics

As of the census of 2000, there were 111 people, 40 households, and 31 families residing in the town. The racial makeup of the town was 86.49% White, 0.90% Native American, 7.21% from other races, and 5.41% from two or more races. Hispanic or Latino of any race were 36.94% of the population.

There were 40 households, out of which 42.5% had children under the age of 18 living with them, 57.5% were married couples living together, 12.5% had a female householder with no husband present, and 22.5% were non-families. 22.5% of all households were made up of individuals, and 15.0% had someone living alone who was 65 years of age or older.  The average household size was 2.78 and the average family size was 3.23.

In the town, the population was spread out, with 34.2% under the age of 18, 9.9% from 18 to 24, 27.0% from 25 to 44, 15.3% from 45 to 64, and 13.5% who were 65 years of age or older.  The median age was 33 years.  For every 100 females, there were 105.6 males.  For every 100 females age 18 and over, there were 92.1 males.

The median income for a household in the town was $23,750, and the median income for a family was $24,375. Males had a median income of $16,250 versus $25,417 for females. The per capita income for the town was $11,816.  About 32.4% of families and 42.7% of the population were below the poverty line, including 60.5% of those under the age of 18 and 5.9% of those 65 and older.

See also

 List of municipalities in Colorado

References

External links

 CDOT map of the Town of Hartman

Towns in Prowers County, Colorado
Towns in Colorado